Prince Imperial Heung (22 August 1845 – 9 September 1912) was a prince of the Joseon dynasty and of the Korean Empire. He was the son of Heungseon Daewongun and the elder brother of Emperor Gojong of Korea. By birth, his original name was Yi Jae-myon and the art name was U-seok; after he acquired the "Prince Imperial" title, his name was changed to Yi Hui on 25 August 1910. Five days later, the Japan–Korea Treaty of 1910 became effective, Yi Hui lost the imperial title and received a title "Duke Yi Hui" instead.

Life 
Prince Imperial Heung was born in 1845, as the son of Prince Heungseon, who was a member of the ruling family but had no authority. In 1864, he passed the literary examination of the Gwageo. He was an official under his father's regency. He visited his father when he was locked in China. After his younger brother got the power, and Kim Hong-jip was appointed as the chancellor, Yi was appointed as Minister of Gungnaebu. In May 1900, Yi became Prince Wanhung. He got Order of the Plum Blossom and Order of the Auspicious Stars in 1907, after the abdication of Gojong and coronation of Sunjong of Korea. In November 1907, Yi was appointed as Lieutenant General. He was later sent to Japan as a diplomat and got 1st class of  Order of the Paulownia Flowers. In 1909, Yi got Order of the Golden Ruler. He helped the annexation of Korea from June 1910. On 15 August 1910, Yi became Prince Imperial Heung. He signed the Japan–Korea Treaty of 1910, which annexed Korea. He was ennobled as Duke Yi Hui after the annexation. He got 830,000 Won for the annexation of Korea and decoration for the annexation of Korea. His title was inherited to Yi Jun-yong.

Family

Father: Yi Ha-Eung, Grand Internal Prince Heungseon (21 December 1820 – 22 February 1898) (이하응 흥선대원군)
Grandfather: Yi Gu, Prince Namyeon (22 August 1788 - 19 March 1836) (이구 남연군)
Grandmother: Princess Consort Min of the Yeoheung Min clan (26 June 1788 - 1831) (군부인 여흥민씨)
Mother: Grand Internal Princess Consort Sunmok of the Yeoheung Min clan (3 February 1818 - 8 January 1898) (순목대원비 민씨)
Maternal Grandfather: Min Chi-Gu (1795 - 14 December 1874) (민치구)
Maternal Grandmother: Lady Yi of the Jeonju Yi clan (? - 17 November 1873) (전주 이씨)
 Brothers
 Older half-brother: Yi Jae-seon, Prince Waneun (완은군 이재선) (1 August 1842 - 28 October 1881)
 Younger brother: King Gojong (고종) (8 September 1852 - 21 January 1919)
 Sister-in-law: Empress Myeongseong of the Yeoheung Min clan (명성태황후 민씨) (17 November 1851 - 8 October 1895)
 Nephew: Emperor Sunjong (순종 효황제) (25 March 1874 - 25 April 1926) 
 Niece-in-law: Empress Sunmyeong of the Yeoheung Min clan (순명효황후 민씨) (20 November 1872 - 5 November 1904) 
 Niece-in-law: Empress Sunjeong of the Hapyeong Yun clan (순정효황후 윤씨) (19 September 1894 - 3 February 1966)
 Sisters
 Younger sister: Lady Yi of the Jeonju Yi clan (이씨, 李氏) (? - 1869)
 Brother-in-law: Jo Gyeong-ho (조경호, 趙慶鎬) of the Imcheon Jo clan (1839 - 1914)
 Younger sister: Lady Yi of the Jeonju Yi clan (이씨, 李氏) (? - 1899)
 Brother-in-law: Jo Jeong-gu (조정구, 趙鼎九) of the Pungyang Jo clan (1860 - 1926)
 Younger half-sister: Lady Yi of the Jeonju Yi clan (이씨) (? - 1869)
 Brother-in-law: Yi Yoon-yong (이윤용, 李允用) (1854 - 8 September 1939)
Consorts and their Respective Issue(s):
Lady Hong of the Pungsan Hong clan (8 April 1844 - 19 December 1887) (풍산 홍씨)
Yi Jun-Yong, Prince Yeongseon (23 July 1870 - 22 March 1917) (이준용 영선군)
Yi Mun-Yong (4 September 1882 - 8 October 1901) (이문용)
Unnamed daughter
Unnamed daughter (? - 21 August 1924)
Princess Imperial Heung of the Yeoju Lee clan (7 June 1883 - 8 January 1978) (흥친왕비 여주 이씨, 驪州 李氏)
 Lady Joo of the Sinan Joo clan (신안 주씨) 
Unnamed daughter

Ancestry

Popular culture 
 Portrayed by Han Beom-hee in the 2001-2002 KBS2 TV series Empress Myeongseong.

References

External links
 "Essays Trace US, Japan Roles in Joseon's Downfall" Korea Times, June 13, 2008

See also 

1845 births
1912 deaths
People from Seoul
House of Yi
Honorary Knights Grand Commander of the Order of the Indian Empire
Korean collaborators with Imperial Japan
Japanese nobility
Korean nobility
19th-century Korean monarchs
Jeonju Yi clan

Imperial Korean military personnel
Lieutenant generals of Korean Empire
Terrorism victims
Politicians of the Korean Empire
Recipients of the Order of the Plum Blossom
1912 murders in Asia